The sicklefin houndshark (Hemitriakis falcata) is a rare houndshark of the family Triakidae, endemic to Western Australia. The holotype was collected from a depth of  Its reproduction is ovoviviparous.

References

External links
 Fishes of Australia : Hemitriakis falcata

sicklefin houndshark
Marine fish of Western Australia
sicklefin houndshark